Hickory County is located in the U.S. state of Missouri. As of the 2020 census, the population was 8,279. Its county seat is Hermitage. The county was organized February 14, 1845, and named after President Andrew Jackson, whose nickname was "Old Hickory." The Pomme de Terre Dam, a Corps of Engineers facility, is located three miles south of Hermitage and forms Lake Pomme de Terre by damming the Pomme de Terre River and Lindley Creek. Truman Reservoir, also a Corps of Engineers facility, floods the Pomme de Terre Reservoir from the northern border of the county southward to the city limits of Hermitage.

Geography
It is the fifth-smallest county in Missouri by area.

Adjacent counties
Benton County (north)
Camden County (east)
Dallas County (southeast)
Polk County (south)
St. Clair County (west)

Major highways
 U.S. Route 54
 U.S. Route 65
 Route 64
 Route 64B
 Route 83
 Route 123

Demographics

As of the census of 2000, there were 8,940 people, 3,911 households, and 2,737 families residing in the county.  The population density was 22 people per square mile (9/km2).  There were 6,184 housing units at an average density of 16 per square mile (6/km2).  The racial makeup of the county was 97.51% White, 0.08% Black or African American, 0.66% Native American, 0.11% Asian, 0.20% from other races, and 1.44% from two or more races. Approximately 0.76% of the population were Hispanic or Latino of any race.

There were 3,911 households, out of which 22.00% had children under the age of 18 living with them, 59.90% were married couples living together, 6.70% had a female householder with no husband present, and 30.00% were non-families. 26.50% of all households were made up of individuals, and 15.10% had someone living alone who was 65 years of age or older.  The average household size was 2.26 and the average family size was 2.70.

In the county, the population was spread out, with 19.90% under the age of 18, 5.30% from 18 to 24, 19.10% from 25 to 44, 29.70% from 45 to 64, and 26.10% who were 65 years of age or older.  The median age was 50 years. For every 100 females there were 96.00 males.  For every 100 females age 18 and over, there were 92.70 males.

The median income for a household in the county was $25,346, and the median income for a family was $28,779. Males had a median income of $22,679 versus $17,610 for females. The per capita income for the county was $13,536.  About 13.00% of families and 19.70% of the population were below the poverty line, including 32.90% of those under age 18 and 11.00% of those age 65 or over.

2020 Census

Education

Public schools
Hermitage R-IV School District – Hermitage
Hermitage Elementary School (PK-05)
Hermitage Middle School (06-08)
Hermitage High School (09-12)
Hickory County R-I School District – Urbana
Skyline Elementary School (K-04)
Skyline Middle School (05-08)
Skyline High School (09-12)
Weaubleau R-III School District – Weaubleau
Weaubleau Elementary School (PK-06)
Weaubleau High School (07-12)
Wheatland R-II School District
Wheatland Elementary School (PK-06)
Wheatland High School (07-12)

Public libraries
Hickory County Library

Politics

Local
The Republican Party predominantly controls politics at the local level in Hickory County. Republicans hold all but four of the elected positions in the county.

State

All of Hickory County is a part of Missouri's 125th District in the Missouri House of Representatives and is represented by Warren D. Love (R-Osceola).

All of Hickory County is a part of Missouri's 28th District in the Missouri Senate. The seat is held by Sandy Crawford, who was elected after the previous incumbent, Mike Parson, was elected lieutenant governor in 2016.

Federal

All of Hickory County is included in Missouri's 4th Congressional District and is currently represented by Vicky Hartzler (R-Harrisonville) in the U.S. House of Representatives.

Political culture

Missouri presidential preference primary (2008)

Former U.S. Senator Hillary Clinton (D-New York) received more votes, a total of 1,056, than any candidate from either party in Hickory County during the 2008 presidential primary.

Communities

Cities and Towns

Cross Timbers
Hermitage (county seat)
Preston
Weaubleau
Wheatland

Unincorporated Communities

 Avery
 Elkton
 Jordan
 Nemo
 Pittsburg
 Quincy
 White Cloud

Notable people
 Mike Parson - 57th Governor of Missouri
 Sally Rand – legendary burlesque dancer

See also
National Register of Historic Places listings in Hickory County, Missouri

References

External links
Hickory County government's website
 Digitized 1930 Plat Book of Hickory County  from University of Missouri Division of Special Collections, Archives, and Rare Books

 
Missouri counties
1845 establishments in Missouri
Populated places established in 1845